Mikhail Pavlovich Savchenko (born 19 June 1980) is a Russian and Ukrainian football coach and a former player. He works as goalkeepers' coach with FC Krasnodar.

External links
 
 

1980 births
People from Torez
Living people
Ukrainian footballers
Russian footballers
Association football goalkeepers
FC Tytan Armyansk players
FC Rostov players
FC Volga Nizhny Novgorod players
Russian Premier League players
Ukrainian Second League players
Ukrainian Amateur Football Championship players
Sportspeople from Donetsk Oblast